was a town located in Isa District, Kagoshima Prefecture, Japan.

As of April 2007, the town had a population of 9,603 and the density of 96.54 persons per km². The total area was 100.47 km².

On November 1, 2008, Hishikari was merged with the city of Ōkuchi to create the city of Isa. Isa District was dissolved as a result of this merger.

Hishikari mine is the largest gold mine in Japan.

References

External links
 Isa official website 

Dissolved municipalities of Kagoshima Prefecture